Bognor is a British drama television series, made by Thames Television for ITV. It was originally shown in 21 episodes between 10 February 1981 and 23 March 1982. It was based on a series of novels by Tim Heald featuring Simon Bognor, an investigator working for the Board of Trade, and starred David Horovitch in the title role.

The first run of stories was shown in February and March 1981, with each story running to six 30-minute episodes. The series was cancelled after only four stories were made. The final story was not broadcast until March 1982, when it was shown in three parts.

Regular cast
 David Horovitch - Simon Bognor 
 Joanna McCallum - Monica
 Ewan Roberts - Parkinson
 Tim Meats - Lingard

Guest cast

Unbecoming Habits
 James Maxwell - Anselm
 Patrick Troughton - Xavier
 Geoffrey Chater - Sir Erris Brig
 Richard Hurndall - Lord Camberley
 Robert Eddison - John
 Charles Lloyd-Pack - Matthew
 Anthony Jackson - Barnabus
 Alec Wallis - George Hey
 Glyn Jones - Sir John Derby
 David Rowlands - Batty Tom
 David Gooderson - Andy
 Edward Peel - Vivian
 John Flint - Insp. Trollope
 Gordon Rollings - Sid
 David Telfer - PC Temple

Deadline
 Benjamin Whitrow - Eric Gringe
 Charlotte Cornwell - Molly Mortimer
 Robert Addie - Willy Wimbledon
 Peter Jeffrey - Milburn Port
 Richard Vernon - Lord Wharfedale
 Glyn Jones - Sir John Derby
 Frances White - Thelma Gringe
 Shirley Dixon - Parson Woodforde
 Glynis Barber - Secretary
 David Calder - Insp. Flanders
 Annette Badland - Charlotte
 Christopher Biggins - Spencer Nugent
 Geoffrey Bateman - Elliston Gravelle

Let Sleeping Dogs Die
 Robin Bailey - Percy Pocklington
 Nigel Davenport - Edgar Eagerly
 Joan Greenwood - Duchess of Dorset
 Elizabeth Spriggs - Alisa Potts
 Michael Bilton - Andrew
 Roy Macready - Mervyn Sparks
 Shane Rimmer - Horace Higgins
 Frederick Treves - Brigadier Willoughby
 Victor Winding - Ramble
 Gabriel Woolf - Jorgen Winterfield
 Alfred Molina - Waiter

Just Desserts
 Andrew Burt - Aubrey Pring
 John Le Mesurier - Blight-Purley
 Lynda Marchal - Lady Aubergine
 Edward de Souza - Pendennis
 Ian Collier - Scoff Smith

Novels
Five of Heald's novels were reissued as tie-ins with the series by Arrow Books in 1981: Unbecoming Habits, Deadline, Let Sleeping Dogs Die, Just Desserts and Blue Blood Will Out. The cancellation of the series meant the fifth novel was never produced for television. Heald continued to write further Bognor novels and they have all been re-issued since without reference to the television series.

DVD release
The series was released on 4 DVDs in the UK (Region 2) by Network DVD in 2011.

References

External links
 

1980s British drama television series
1981 British television series debuts
ITV television dramas
1982 British television series endings
Television series by Fremantle (company)
Television shows produced by Thames Television
English-language television shows